Midmark Corporation makes medical, dental, and veterinary products and provides related services. It was founded in 1915 as The Cummings Machine Company. Headquartered in Dayton, Ohio, USA, Midmark maintains production and administrative offices in Versailles, Ohio, as well as seven other locations in the United States, one in Mumbai, India, and one in Quattro Castella, Italy.

Midmark is a fourth generation, privately held organization.

History 

Midmark, formerly The Cummings Machine Company, was founded in 1915, manufacturing cement mixers. In 1918 Cummings bought the Reeves Pulley Company's engine business. In 1921 the company expanded its product line to mining locomotives, foundry equipment, and custom metal fabrications, and became the Industrial Equipment Company. John Eiting was the first member of the Eiting family to hold a leadership position, being named president in 1925. John's son Carl Eiting joined the company in 1930 and became president in 1953.

1950s - 1970s 
Carl's son, Jim Eiting, joined the company in 1956, developing a new strategy which led Midmark into the medical industry, and in 1968 the company acquired the medical examination table product line of American Metal Furniture Company. The company was then renamed IE Industries for "innovative engineering." It also introduced the world's only solid frame, hydrostatic trencher, used for cutting ditches for utility underground lines and general construction. These new product lines resulted in the creation of three product divisions: Midmark Medical, Midmark Power (trencher), and Midmark Steel (mining equipment and custom manufacturing). In 1978, IE Industries became Midmark Corporation.

1980s - 1990s 
Midmark purchased the Ritter line of medical equipment from Sybron in 1986, then designed and developed casework and sterilizers for the medical and dental markets. It acquired Knight Manufacturing, Inc. in Asheville, North Carolina, expanding its product offerings in the dental market. As part of a global initiative, Midmark purchased the French holding company, Arteme and its subsidiaries, Promotal and Beaumond, located in Ernée, France, in 1998.

2000–present 
In 2000, Jim Eiting's daughter, Dr. Anne Eiting Klamar, who was practicing medicine at Family Practice Physicians in Urbana, Ohio, joined Midmark and was appointed to president and CEO. 

Midmark made several acquisitions to broaden each of its markets:

 Brentwood Medical Products, Torrance, California - digital diagnostic products

 Apollo Dental Products, Clovis, California - air compressors and evacuation systems for the dental market

 Matrx, Orchard Park, New York  - air compressors and evacuation systems for dental and veterinary medicine
 DBL7, Fort Collins, Colorado - veterinary power examination and procedure tables, including the Canis Major Exam Lift Table
 European Design, Inc., Glasgow, Kentucky - a premium wood cabinetry company
 Sharn Veterinary, Inc., Tampa, Florida - monitoring and critical care equipment for animal healthcare under the Cardell, CardEx, and Versaflo brands
 Progeny, Inc., Lincolnshire, Illinois - radiographic imaging products for human and animal dental markets
 Newmed, S.r.L, Quattro Castella, Italy- tabletop sterilization products and accessories for the medical, dental, and animal health markets
 VSSI, Inc., a manufacturer of veterinary practice equipment, located in Carthage, Missouri
 Kennel manufacturer, Mason Company Leesburg, Ohio
Schroer Manufacturing Company (Shor-Line) animal health equipment manufacturer. Kansas City, Kansas

In 2010, Midmark acquired the majority equity position in Janak Healthcare Private Limited, a healthcare equipment company based in Mumbai, India. It also partnered with Mortara Instrument in Milwaukee, Wisconsin, adding new products to its line of diagnostic devices.

Midmark moved its headquarters from Versailles, Ohio to Dayton, Ohio, located at the University of Dayton River Campus, in 2013.

In 2014, Midmark took sole ownership of Janak Healthcare Private Limited in Mumbai, India with manufacturing in Umargam, Gujarat.

In 2016, Midmark acquired Versus Technology, Inc., a maker of locating technology, badges, and software located in Traverse City, Michigan.

In 2016, Midmark acquired VSSI Inc., a manufacturer of veterinary practice equipment located in Carthage, Missouri

In 2018, Midmark moved its headquarters from Dayton, Ohio, located at the University of Dayton River Campus to Austin Landing in Miamisburg, Ohio.

In 2019, Midmark acquired Mason Company, an animal boarding and containment solutions company located in Leesburg, Ohio and Lebanon, Ohio

Awards 
Midmark has been named one of the "Healthiest Companies in America" by Interactive Health Solutions (IHS).

Midmark was the recipient of the Best-in-Class Award in 2009, 2010 and 2011 for achieving Best-in-Class status in the Electromedical product category. This award is determined through a combination of year-over-year market share growth and total market share.

In 2011, Midmark has been presented the Medical Design Excellence Award for its 625 Barrier-Free Examination table.

In 2016, Midmark received a GOOD Design Award for its Artizan Dental Cabinetry.

Midmark received a Certificate of Excellence in the 2016 American In-house Design Awards for its first iBook.

In 2016, Midmark received a Dayton Business Journal Manufacturing Award for Workforce Training.

References

Medical technology companies of the United States
Dental companies of the United States
Companies based in Dayton, Ohio